This is a list of characters from the film series The Godfather consisting of The Godfather (1972), The Godfather Part II (1974) and The Godfather Part III (1990), based on Mario Puzo's best-selling 1969 novel of the same name, as well as the book series The Godfather consisting of the original, Puzo's The Sicilian (1984), Mark Winegardner's The Godfather Returns (2004) and The Godfather's Revenge (2006), and Edward Falco's prequel novel The Family Corleone (2012). There are also three video games set within The Godfather universe were also created: The Godfather (1991), The Godfather (2006) and The Godfather II (2009).

Corleone family

Vito Corleone

Vito Andolini Corleone is a fictional character in Mario Puzo's novel The Godfather and in the first two of Francis Ford Coppola's film trilogy. He is portrayed by Marlon Brando in The Godfather and as a young man by Robert De Niro in The Godfather Part II. He is the leader of the Corleone crime family, as well as the patriarch of the Corleone family. Brando and De Niro both winning Oscars for their performances marked the first time two separate actors won Oscars for portraying the same character.

Carmela Corleone

Carmela "Mama" Corleone is a fictional character who appears in Mario Puzo's The Godfather, as well as its first two film adaptations. She is portrayed by Morgana King. She is the wife of Vito Corleone and the mother of Sonny, Fredo, Michael and Connie Corleone, and the adoptive mother of Tom Hagen.

Santino "Sonny" Corleone

Santino "Sonny" Corleone is a fictional character in Mario Puzo's 1969 novel The Godfather and its 1972 film adaptation. He is the oldest son of the Vito and Carmela Corleone. He has two brothers, Fredo and Michael, and a sister, Connie. In the film, Sonny was portrayed by James Caan, who reprised his role for a flashback scene in The Godfather Part II. Roman Coppola played Sonny as a boy in the 1920s scenes of The Godfather Part II. Sonny's hot-tempered nature eventually leads to his early death.

Fredo Corleone

Frederico "Fredo" Corleone is a fictional character in Mario Puzo's 1969 novel The Godfather and its 1972 film adaptation, as well as its 1974 sequel. He is portrayed by John Cazale. He is the second born son of Vito and Carmela Corleone, but is passed over when his younger brother Michael succeeds their father as head of the family due to Fredo's incompetence. In The Godfather Part II, betrayal of his family eventually leads to Michael having him killed.

Michael Corleone

Michael Corleone is the protagonist of Mario Puzo's novel The Godfather and Francis Ford Coppola's film trilogy based on the novel. He is the third son of Vito and Carmela Corleone. He is portrayed by Al Pacino in the films. His journey from family outsider to ruthless Mafia boss and eventual redemption is the central focus of the novel and the films.

Connie Corleone

Constanzia "Connie" Corleone is a fictional character in Mario Puzo's novel The Godfather and Francis Ford Coppola's film trilogy. She is portrayed by Talia Shire. Connie is the only daughter and youngest child of Vito and Carmela Corleone. The first film and novel begins with her marriage to her abusive husband, Carlo Rizzi. After her husband's murder is arranged by her brother, Michael, she becomes estranged from her family. The death of her mother Carmela prompts her to become closer to her family. She eventually becomes one of Michael's closest allies.

Tom Hagen

Thomas "Tom" Hagen is a fictional character in Mario Puzo's novel The Godfather and Francis Ford Coppola's films The Godfather and The Godfather Part II. He is portrayed by Robert Duvall in the films. He is a consigliere and lawyer for the Corleone crime family. He is also an informally adopted member of the Corleone family.

Sandra Corleone
Sandrinella "Sandra" Corleone (née Colombo) is a fictional character appearing in Mario Puzo's novel The Godfather and its first film adaptation. She was portrayed by Julie Gregg. She is the wife of Sonny Corleone.  Sandra and Sonny bore four children.  Two boys and a set of twin girls.

Vincent Mancini

Vincent Santino "Vinnie" Mancini is a fictional character appearing in The Godfather Part III. He is portrayed by Andy García. He is the illegitimate son of Sonny Corleone and Lucy Mancini. At the end of the film, he succeeds his uncle Michael Corleone as head of the Corleone crime family using the title Don Vincent Corleone.

Anthony Corleone

Anthony "Tony" Corleone is a fictional character in Mario Puzo's novel The Godfather and Francis Ford Coppola's film trilogy. He is the son of Michael Corleone and Kay Adams-Corleone. He is portrayed by Franc D'Ambrosio. While he is the son of a Mafia boss, he does not join the family business and becomes an opera singer in The Godfather Part III.

Mary Corleone

Mary Corleone is a fictional character appearing in Francis Ford Coppola's film trilogy The Godfather. She is the daughter of Michael Corleone and Kay Adams-Corleone. She is portrayed by Sofia Coppola. She is a childish and naive girl. Mary attempts to begin a relationship with her cousin, Vincent Corleone. Her murder at the end of The Godfather Part III devastates her father Michael.

Kay Adams Corleone
Katherine "Kay" Corleone (née Adams) is a fictional character in Mario Puzo's novel The Godfather and Francis Ford Coppola's film trilogy. She is portrayed by Diane Keaton. Before their divorce, she is the second wife of Michael Corleone. She is also the mother of Anthony and Mary Corleone. She has an abortion while pregnant with the couple's prospective second son. In contrast to most of the characters in the novel and films, Kay Adams is from a well-to-do White Anglo-Saxon Protestant family.

Apollonia Vitelli Corleone
Apollonia Corleone (née Vitelli) is a fictional character in Mario Puzo's novel The Godfather. She is portrayed by Simonetta Stefanelli in the film adaptation of the same name. She also appears in flashbacks in The Godfather Part III.

Apollonia is a young Sicilian woman of Greek descent who meets Michael Corleone during his exile in Sicily. After seeing her for the first time, Michael and his bodyguards inquire about her to Signore Vitelli, a local tavern keeper, to try and find out who she is. After describing her in detail, Vitelli angrily says he does not know her and leaves. When Michael's bodyguards realize that the girl is Signore Vitelli's daughter, they both ask Michael to leave, but Michael, speaking through his bodyguard and interpreter Fabrizio, soon gains Signore Vitelli's respect by introducing himself and apologizing. Michael asks and receives Signore Vitelli's permission to court Apollonia under the chaperonage of her family. After a brief courtship, they are married.

Soon afterward, however, Apollonia is killed by a car bomb intended for Michael. The attack was set up by Fabrizio, who had betrayed Michael to Corleone family enemies back in Michael's native New York City. In an unfortunate twist of fate, she unknowingly puts herself in danger when she tries to impress Michael by showing him that she taught herself how to drive, which was uncommon for Sicilian women. In the book, she is pregnant at the time of her death, but this detail is not specified in the film. The explosion is powerful enough to throw Michael off his feet and knock him unconscious. The local Mafia chieftain, Don Tommasino, an old friend of Michael's father Vito, moves Michael to a hospital. Michael regains consciousness a few days later, whereupon Don Tommasino informs Michael of his wife's death. After returning to the United States, Michael reconnects with his previous girlfriend, Kay Adams, but does not tell her that he had been married while he was living in Sicily. They marry and have two children. However, in The Godfather Part III, Kay mentions Michael's first marriage when she and Michael visit Sicily together. Michael also tells his daughter Mary Corleone that she bears a resemblance to his first wife Apollonia.

In the novel, Michael avenges Apollonia's death. Fabrizio is found running a pizza parlor in Buffalo, New York, under the alias of Fred Vincent. He is shot in the chest by an assassin who walks into the pizza parlor. The assassin then tells him "Michael Corleone sends his regards", before shooting him again in the head. In a deleted scene from the film's script, Michael himself kills Fabrizio with a shotgun. This scene was never released, although publicity photos were distributed of Al Pacino, who portrayed Michael, firing a shotgun. A scene was filmed for Part II in which Michael is informed that Fabrizio has been found. The former bodyguard is killed in his car with a powerful bomb wired to the ignition, matching the car bomb that he used to kill Apollonia. The scene was removed from the final cut of the film, but it can be seen in The Godfather Saga.

Johnny Fontane
Johnny Fontane, a mob-associated singer and Vito's godson, seeks Vito's help in securing a movie role; Vito dispatches his consigliere, Tom Hagen, to Los Angeles to persuade studio head Jack Woltz to give Johnny the part. Woltz refuses until he wakes up in bed with the severed head of his prized stallion.

Al Martino, a then famed singer in nightclubs, was notified of the character Johnny Fontane by a friend who read the eponymous novel and felt Martino represented the character of Johnny Fontane. Martino then contacted producer Albert S. Ruddy, who gave him the part. However, Martino was stripped of the part after Francis Ford Coppola became director and then awarded the role to singer Vic Damone. According to Martino, after being stripped of the role, he went to Russell Bufalino, his godfather and a crime boss, who then orchestrated the publication of various news articles that claimed Coppola was unaware of Ruddy having given Martino the part. Damone eventually dropped the role because he did not want to provoke the mob, in addition to being paid too little. Ultimately, the part of Johnny Fontane was given to Martino.

Frank Sinatra was convinced that Johnny Fontane was based on his life. Mario Puzo, author of The Godfather novel wrote in 1972 that when he met Sinatra in Chasen's, Sinatra "started to shout abuse", calling Puzo a "pimp" and threatening physical violence. Francis Ford Coppola, director of the film adaptation, said in the audio commentary that "obviously Johnny Fontane was inspired by a kind of Frank Sinatra character".

Genco Abbandando
Genco Abbandando was the first consigliere of the Corleone family, and childhood friend to Vito Corleone. Frank Sivero portrayed Genco in The Godfather Part II as a young man, and Franco Corsaro portrayed Genco as an old man in a deleted scene in The Godfather.

Raised in New York City's Little Italy, Genco worked at his father's grocery store from an early age. He became friends with the hired hand, Vito Corleone, and was upset when Vito was fired by his father, forced to do so by the neighborhood boss Don Fanucci. Genco offered to steal from his father to help his friend, but Vito refused, saying this would be an offense to his father.

After Vito kills Fanucci and becomes the new Don of the neighborhood, he hires Genco to act as his consigliere, and names his front company "Genco Pura Olive Oil Company" after his friend. Genco serves as Vito's most trusted adviser for decades, until he is stricken with cancer and can no longer fulfill his duties. During this time, Tom Hagen, Vito's informally adopted son, stands in for him. Genco dies in 1945, the day after Vito's daughter Connie's wedding. A scene where Vito visits Genco on his death bed in hospital after the wedding was ultimately cut from The Godfather film.

Corleone family allies

Luca Brasi

Peter Clemenza

Al Neri

Frank Pentangeli

Salvatore "Sal" Tessio

Don Tommasino
Don Tommasino is a Sicilian Mafia Don controlling  the towns of Corleone and possibly Bagheria. He appears in all three films, first assisting and protecting Michael Corleone during his hiding in the American-occupied Sicily in The Godfather, hosting him first in Corleone and then in his own countryside villa, and acting as his liaison with Sonny in New York City. He is later seen in The Godfather Part II during Vito's storyline, as he "introduces" Vito to Don Ciccio in the 1920s (purportedly to ask for his blessing to start their olive oil exportation business, possibly implying that he has a role in the Corleones's cover company) and aiding him in the chieftain's assassination, after which he is injured by Don Ciccio's . It is obviously implied that he takes the Don's place as chieftain of Corleone. He last appears in The Godfather Part III, now forced on a wheelchair, hosting the Corleones at his villa. He is killed by the contract killers Mosca and Spara as he recognises them when they try to kill Michael disguised as friars. His death has a notable impact on Michael, ultimately leading him to decide to abandon Mafia life.

Unlike most other Dons in the saga, Tommasino is known by his name/nickname rather than by his surname, according to the actual Sicilian use ("Tommasino" is a diminutive for "Tommaso"). Don Tommasino is portrayed by Corrado Gaipa as an adult in Part I, by Mario Cotone as a young man in Part II and by Vittorio Duse as an old man in Part III.

Corleone family enemies

Don Osvaldo "Ozzie" Altobello

Emilio Barzini

Don Fanucci

Moe Greene

Captain McCluskey

Captain Mark McCluskey is a fictional character in Mario Puzo's The Godfather.

In the novel and film, McCluskey is a corrupt Irish American New York police captain, in Francis Ford Coppola's film adaptation, he is portrayed by Sterling Hayden.

Virgil Sollozzo unsuccessfully attempts to assassinate Don Vito Corleone after a failed attempt to obtain financing and police and political protection for his emerging heroin business. When Sollozzo learns Corleone survived, he sends agents to the hospital for another attempt by having Captain McCluskey (Sterling Hayden), a New York City police captain on his payroll, arrest Don Corleone's personal guards at the hospital and remove the police officers stationed outside the Don's hospital room. The assassination attempt fails after Vito's youngest son Michael arrives, and finding all the guards gone, suspects another assassination attempt is about to happen. He moves his father to another room, then tricks the would-be assassins into believing guards are still protecting his father. Captain McCluskey arrives and confronts Michael, punching him and breaking his jaw. Hagen arrives shortly afterwards with guards legally licensed to carry weapons; McCluskey, unable to arrest them without raising suspicions, backs down and leaves.

Soon after, Sollozzo seeks a meeting with Michael to resolve the hostilities, although at Michael's urging, the Corleones view this as an opportunity to kill Sollozzo, which would, of necessity, also involve killing McCluskey. Michael successfully convinces Sonny Corleone, Tom Hagen and other leaders of the Family that the usual strict Mafia prohibition against killing police for fear of bringing down the retribution of the authorities should not apply in this case, since McCluskey is a corrupt cop on the mafia's payroll, and who is involved in drugs. He further says that this would make a sensational news story to be given to newspaper people on the Corleone Family payroll after the fact.

Under McCluskey's personal protection, Sollozzo meets with Michael in a Bronx restaurant. Although Michael is frisked before the meeting, a revolver has been planted behind the overhead tank of a toilet in the restaurant's lavatory. The Corleones were able to do this only because they found out in advance, from a cop in McCluskey's precinct, where the meeting would take place, on account of police regulations requiring McCluskey to leave an address where he could be reached that night. Michael excuses himself to go to the bathroom, and retrieves the revolver. When he returns, he draws the gun and shoots Sollozzo in the forehead, killing him instantly, and kills McCluskey with two shots moments later.

Although the double murder, including that of a police captain, brings an official crackdown on organized crime, the subsequent leak of information about McCluskey's criminal links to Sollozzo - as Michael correctly predicted - gets wide coverage in the newspapers and takes some of the attention off Michael and his family.

Johnny Ola
Johnny Ola is a fictional character in The Godfather Part II. He is portrayed by Dominic Chianese.

Johnny Ola is a mobster and right-hand man to Jewish mobster Hyman Roth. He is an enforcer and "made man" of one of Five Families of New York City. Ola is Sicilian but speaks American English with a New York accent. Ola is part of Roth's plan to assassinate Michael Corleone at his home at Lake Tahoe, with unwitting help from Michael's brother Fredo. When Michael asks if Fredo and Johnny had ever met, they deny knowing each other. Later, however, Fredo carelessly reveals that he and Ola had visited a nightclub together in Havana. Michael overhears the conversation and realizes that Fredo is the traitor within the family. Michael sends his bodyguard Bussetta to kill Ola and Roth. Bussetta strangles Ola, but fails to kill Roth.

Carlo Rizzi

Louie Russo 
Luigi "Louie" Russo is a fictional character in Mark Winegardner's The Godfather Returns. Russo serves as the Don of the Chicago Outfit from 1955 to 1961.

Louie Russo and his brother, Willy, were 'made' under Al Capone. His brother was one of the men sent to kill Vito Corleone during the Castellammarese War (mentioned in The Godfather), although he was eventually killed by Luca Brasi.

Russo holds a grudge against the Corleones for years for his brother's death, at one point attempting (unsuccessfully) to have Vito's son Fredo killed. After Michael Corleone becomes Don in 1955, however, Russo tricks him into believing that the bad blood between them is over. Under Russo, the Chicago mob expands into the New York area and interferes with the Corleones' Las Vegas casinos. Russo unsuccessfully conspires with Vincent Forlenza and Nick Geraci to kill Michael Corleone, in the process indirectly duping Fredo into betraying his brother to Hyman Roth.

In June 1961, he invites Tom Hagen to his supper club/gambling house in rural Illinois with the intention of killing him. He, Hagen, a rower, and two Russo soldatos go out on a gondola in his man-made lake. On the course of the trip, as part of Michael's revenge, Hagen strangles one soldato while the rower hits Russo and the other soldato with his oar. Hagen then personally kills Russo on his boat, with Russo's own gun, and dumps the bodies in the lake.

In his appearances in The Godfather Returns, Russo is portrayed as a cruel, vindictive man whose methods of retribution are particularly vicious, even by Mafia standards; in the sequel The Godfather's Revenge, Tom Hagen describes Russo as "a sick man, in ways I don't like to think about." Following an assassination attempt years before, in which his eyes are permanently damaged, he wears large black sunglasses to shield them from the light. When he inadvertently shows his uncovered eyes to Tom Hagen after his glasses are knocked off, Hagen notes that they are red with a green ring in the middle. The novel reveals that Russo is estranged from his gay son, but still uses him as a source of information on closeted rivals for purposes of blackmail and gamesmanship with the other families.

Hyman Roth

Virgil Sollozzo
Virgil "The Turk" Sollozzo is a fictional character in Mario Puzo's novel The Godfather. He is portrayed by Al Lettieri in the film adaptation of the same name.

In 1945, heroin kingpin Virgil Sollozzo asks Vito to invest in his operation. Sollozzo is backed by the rival Tattaglia family, and wants Vito's political influence and legal protection. Vito declines, believing the politicians and judges on his payroll would turn against him if he engaged in drug trafficking. During the meeting, Sonny expresses interest in the deal. After the meeting, Vito castigates his son for letting an outsider know what he was thinking. During Christmas, as Vito crosses a street to buy oranges from a vendor, Sollozzo's hitmen emerge with guns drawn. Vito runs for his Cadillac, but is shot five times. Fredo, who had been accompanying Vito, drops his gun and is unable to return fire as the assassins escape.

Vito survives, and Sollozzo makes a second assassination attempt at the hospital. Mark McCluskey—a corrupt police captain on Sollozzo's payroll—has removed Vito's bodyguards, leaving him unprotected. However, Michael arrives moments before the imminent attack. Realizing his father is in danger, Michael and a nurse move Vito to another room. Michael affirms his loyalty at Vito's bedside.

While Vito recovers, Sonny serves as acting head of the family. Michael, knowing his father will never be safe while Sollozzo lives, convinces Sonny that he can murder Sollozzo and McCluskey. Michael kills both men and is smuggled to Sicily under the protection of Vito's friend and business partner Don Tommasino. The deaths of Sollozzo and McCluskey ignite a war between the Corleone and the Tattaglia families, with the other New York families backing the latter. After Sonny is killed by Barzini's men, Vito resumes control and brokers a peace accord among the families, during which he realizes that Barzini masterminded the attempt on his life and Sonny's murder.

Joey Zasa
Joey Zasa is a fictional character and antagonist appearing in The Godfather Part III. He was portrayed by Joe Mantegna.

Zasa is a longtime member of Corleone caporegime Peter Clemenza's regime. Following the retirement of Ritchie Nobilio, who succeeded Frank Pentangeli (Michael V. Gazzo) after the events of The Godfather Part II, Zasa assumes control over the Corleone family business in New York City with approval from the Commission and Michael Corleone (Al Pacino). Zasa is feared and, to a certain degree, respected among his peers in the New York underworld for his business acumen and utter ruthlessness. However, his flamboyance and hunger for publicity earns Michael's displeasure, especially during the 1970s when it attracts unwanted public attention to Michael's criminal past when he is attempting to rehabilitate his public image. Michael especially disapproves of Zasa's eagerness to enter the drug trade, and distances himself from him.

In The Godfather Part III, Zasa first appears at a reception honoring Michael. He gets into an argument with one of his soldiers, Vincent Mancini (Andy García), the illegitimate son of Sonny Corleone. Zasa calls Vincent a bastard in Michael's presence, prompting the enraged young man to attack Zasa. Zasa subsequently hires two assassins to kill Vincent, but Vincent quickly kills both.

Later in the film, Zasa participates in a plot to have Michael assassinated during a meeting with the various Dons in Atlantic City, New Jersey. During the meeting, Michael insults Zasa, prompting him to storm out; moments later, a helicopter containing gunmen hovers above the room and guns down nearly everyone inside. Michael escapes, but nearly every other Don is killed.  The survivors make deals with Zasa.

Several days later, Michael's sister Connie (Talia Shire) gives clearance for Vincent to kill Zasa before he can take another run at Michael.  Vincent assassinates Zasa in Bensonhurst during a street festival. Vincent's men and Michael's personal assassin Al Neri (disguised as members of the church procession) kill Zasa's bodyguards, while Vincent (disguised as an NYPD Mounted Patrol officer) shoots Zasa in the back three times as he attempts to escape.

Other characters

Amerigo Bonasera
Amerigo Bonasera is a fictional character created by Mario Puzo who appears in his novel The Godfather, as well as Francis Ford Coppola's 1972 film adaptation. Though he is not a major character, he plays a vital role in revealing the merciful side of main character Vito Corleone. The novel opens with the words: "Amerigo Bonasera sat at New York Criminal Court..." The film also starts with his famous line, "I believe in America. America has made my fortune."

Bonasera is a proud Italian-American undertaker who tends to keep away from the Corleone family, knowing they are involved with the Mafia, though Don Corleone's wife is a godmother to Bonasera's daughter. His daughter is brutally beaten by her boyfriend and his friend for refusing to have sex after they had plied her with whiskey. The men escape any serious penalty because they are from wealthy, politically connected families.

Desperate, Bonasera decides to go to Don Corleone on the day of his daughter's wedding to ask him to kill the young men; according to tradition, a Sicilian never refuses a favor on the day of his daughter's wedding. His proposition angers Don Corleone, who reprimands him for asking for a favor without showing the proper respect, and for seeking the attackers' deaths when his daughter was alive and would recover. Nevertheless, Vito agrees to grant a favor in return for Bonasera's "friendship" and the respectful address of "Godfather". Vito Corleone also gently reprimands Bonasera for attempting to seek justice through the courts instead of coming to him first.

Vito hands the job to Peter Clemenza with explicit instructions that his men aren't to get "carried away" and accidentally kill anyone. The next evening, Paulie Gatto and two other members of his crew give the men a brutal beating that puts them in the hospital for months. Bonasera sends his thanks to Vito through Corleone family consigliere Tom Hagen. Though feeling safer now that he has Don Corleone on his side, Bonasera begins dreading the day Corleone asks him a favor; he has a nightmare of the Don ordering him to bury the bodies of two men he has just killed.

Later in the film, Hagen calls on Bonasera to finally pay back the favor. Initially terrified, Bonasera is relieved when Vito Corleone comes to his funeral parlor with the corpse of his eldest son, Sonny Corleone, who has been gunned down by the Barzini family. A heartbroken Vito merely requests that Bonasera repair the extensive physical damage so that Sonny's mother can have an open casket. Bonasera is seen one final time at Vito Corleone's funeral; the novel states he had fulfilled all obligations and satisfied their friendship by preparing Sonny's body for burial.

In the 1972 film, Bonasera is played by Salvatore Corsitto (1913–1999).

In the 2006 video game adaptation, Aldo Trapani, instead of Clemenza, is ordered to punish the two perpetrators, who are found in the graveyard outside Bonasera's funeral home harassing Bonasera's daughter. He attacks the assailants, knocking them out and leaving one in an open grave.

Cardinal Lamberto

Lucy Mancini
Lucy Mancini is a fictional character in Mario Puzo's The Godfather. She was portrayed by Jeannie Linero and appears in The Godfather and The Godfather Part III.

She is one of the childhood friends of Vito Corleone's children, particularly his daughter, Connie Corleone. She is the maid of honor at Connie's wedding. Lucy has sex with Vito's son Sonny at the wedding and begins an extramarital affair with him. The novel and the films diverge in their treatments of Lucy's fate after Sonny's death.

In the novel, Lucy is a fairly important supporting character, with several chapters dedicated to her story.  After Sonny's death, Vito's consigliere, Tom Hagen sends Lucy to Las Vegas. She is given a small interest (five and later ten "points") in one of the family's hotels, primarily so that she can keep an eye on Vito's middle son, Fredo, who is learning the hotel and casino business. She also serves as a shareholder-of-record who has no criminal record: several such owners are necessary for a valid gaming license. On paper she is a millionaire, although she does not vote her shares in the casinos. Eventually, Lucy establishes a new life in Las Vegas, and becomes largely independent of the Corleone clan. She is lonely, however, and occasionally pines for Sonny: while never having loved him or even truly known him, she misses him as a lover, and cannot achieve sexual satisfaction with anyone else. That changes when she meets and falls in love with surgeon Dr. Jules Segal. He explains that her difficulty in reaching orgasm is caused by a loose vagina, which commonly results from multiple childbirths. In Lucy's case, this appears to be congenital and can be remedied with simple vaginal surgery. After Segal's colleague in Los Angeles performs the surgery, Lucy is able to enjoy sex again, and she and Jules presumably are happily married.

In Francis Ford Coppola's film adaptations, Lucy's role is minimal.  She is seen as a young woman in The Godfather, but her character is not featured after Sonny's death. She makes no appearance in The Godfather Part II, and in The Godfather Part III, she is present in a manner inconsistent with her fate as described in The Godfather novel. Lucy is the mother of Sonny's illegitimate son, Vincent, who eventually succeeds Michael Corleone as the head of the Corleone crime family.  She appears briefly as a guest in the party scene at the beginning of the film when Michael invites Vincent to join the family for a group photo. In Puzo's original novel, Sonny does not impregnate her.

Danny Shea

Mickey Shea

Billy Van Arsdale

Aldo Trapani

Albert Volpe

The Five Families
The Five Families are five major Mafia crime families in the novel and film The Godfather. The families are based on the real life New York City Five Families, five major Italian American crime families.

The Corleones 

The Dons of the Corleone family:

 Vito Corleone (1920–1955)
Michael Corleone (1955–1980)
Vincent Corleone (1980–unknown)

The Tattaglias 
The Dons of the Tattaglia family:

Philip Tattaglia (1920s–1955)
Riccardo "Rico" Tattaglia (1955–1962)
Osvaldo "Ozzie" Altobello  (1962–1980)

The Barzinis 
The Dons of the Barzini family:

Giuseppe Mariposa (1920s–1934)
Emilio Barzini (1934–1955)
Paulie Fortunato (1955–19??)

The Cuneos 
The Dons of the Cuneo family:

Carmine Cuneo/Ottilio Cuneo (1920s–1955)
Leo Cuneo (1955–1979)

The Straccis 
The Dons of the Stracci family:

Anthony Stracci/Victor Stracci (1920s–1955)
Mario Stracci (1955–1972)

References

Fictional Mafia crime families
Lists of film characters
Lists of literary characters